is a former Japanese football player. He played for Japan national team. His brother Atsushi Uchiyama also played for Japan national team.

Club career
Uchiyama was born in Shizuoka Prefecture on April 14, 1957. After graduating from University of Tsukuba, he joined Yamaha Motors in 1980. The club won 1982 Emperor's Cup and 1987–88 Japan Soccer League. He retired in 1989. He played 122 games and scored 4 goals in the league.

National team career
On May 26, 1985, Uchiyama debuted for Japan national team against Uruguay.

Club statistics

National team statistics

References

External links
Japan National Football Team Database

1957 births
Living people
University of Tsukuba alumni
Association football people from Shizuoka Prefecture
Japanese footballers
Japan international footballers
Japan Soccer League players
Júbilo Iwata players
Association football defenders